is a shooter game developed and published by SNK. It was released in North America for the arcade in 1989, and it was ported to the Nintendo Entertainment System in 1990. It can be played with either the NES controller or the NES Zapper light gun.

Easter egg
On the System Construction Screen in the NES version, the player can cause a female figure to undress herself by certain inputs. The player can continue to make certain inputs following the undressing of the female figure, but it also will show a hexagram which will cause the game to freeze up.

Robot Terminator 
Terminator (1984)

References

External links
Arcade-History

(not shown): SNK, NES version Box Art by Marc Ericksen, 1989.

1989 video games
Arcade video games
Nintendo Entertainment System games
SNK games
Light gun games
Video games scored by Kikuko Hataya
Video games developed in Japan